Steinhart Park is a recreation area in Nebraska City, Nebraska. It is named after John W. Steinhart, who developed Nebraska City's meat-packing industry, was city postmaster, helped form the public library, Steinhart Park, Nebraska City High School, the Nebraska school for the blind, organized the Chamber of Commerce, and was mayor of Nebraska City. The park includes three baseball diamonds, four tennis courts, a basketball court, a skatepark,  horseshoe rings, a local swimming pool, and Steinhart Lodge, a convention centre, previously a restaurant.

External links
Steinhart Park entry on recreationparks.net
  Location Map

Parks in Nebraska
Protected areas of Otoe County, Nebraska
Nebraska City, Nebraska
Tourist attractions in Nebraska City, Nebraska